USS Poinsett (AK-205) was an  acquired by the US Navy just prior to the end of World War II. She carried supplies and ammunition to the Pacific Ocean battle areas and was awarded one battle star for her operations in the Borneo area.

Construction 
Poinsett was laid down under US Maritime Commission (MARCOM) contract, MC hull 2158, by Leathem D. Smith Shipbuilding Company, Sturgeon Bay, Wisconsin, 6 November 1943; launched 22 May 1944; sponsored by Mrs. Robert L. Rote; acquired by the Navy 22 January 1945; and commissioned at Houston, Texas, 7 February 1945.

Service history

World War II service
After shakedown off Galveston, Texas, Poinsett loaded ammunition at Theodore, Alabama, and departed for the Panama Canal 21 March. She steamed to Ulithi thence to Zamboanga, Philippine Islands, arriving 11 May.

After issuing ammunition there, she proceeded to Tawi Tawi, Sulu Archipelago, and joined the main forces for the invasion of Balikpapan (1 July). On 10 July she departed Borneo for Morotai and the Philippines, whence she sailed southeast to Manus. There, while loading fleet issue clothing and small stores, she received word of the war’s end.

Post-war decommissioning
Poinsett then proceeded to Manila and Guiuan, Samar, to discharge her cargo. She departed 19 November for the Panama Canal and Norfolk, Virginia, for inactivation. Decommissioned 25 January 1946, she was returned to MARCOM, 29 January 1946, and her name was struck from the Navy List, 12 March 1946.

Merchant service
On 25 February 1947, MARCOM sold Poinsett to Bergenske Dampakibaselskab (Bergen Line), of, Norway, for $693,862. She was reflagged for Norway and her name was changed to Carina.

She was subsequently sold to the Government of South Korea and renamed Masan. She was scrapped in 1979, in South Korea.

Honors and awards 
Poinsett received one battle star for World War II service:
 Borneo Campaign (1 to 10 July 1945)

Notes 

Citations

Bibliography 

Online resources

External links

 

Alamosa-class cargo ships
Ships built in Sturgeon Bay, Wisconsin
1944 ships
World War II auxiliary ships of the United States
Ammunition ships of the United States Navy
Poinsett County, Arkansas